The Austin Daily Tribune Building, later known as the Ernest O. Thompson State Office Building, is a Moderne style office building located at 920 Colorado in Austin, Texas.  It was built in 1941 as the headquarters of the Austin Daily Tribune, a short-lived newspaper that ceased publishing in 1942.  The State of Texas purchased the building in 1945, and it was renamed in 1965 for Texas Railroad Commissioner Ernest O. Thompson.  The building was designed by architect Shirley Simons and the firm of Page, Southerland & Page.  It was listed on the National Register of Historic Places in 2000.

References

Newspaper headquarters in the United States
Newspaper buildings
Office buildings completed in 1941
National Register of Historic Places in Austin, Texas
1940s architecture in the United States
Streamline Moderne architecture in the United States
Office buildings on the National Register of Historic Places in Texas
Office buildings in Austin, Texas